Dilanchi Arkhi may refer to:
 Dilanchi Arkhi-ye Olya
 Dilanchi Arkhi-ye Sofla
 Dilanchi-ye Arkhi